McMullan is a Gaelic surname. Notable people with the surname include:

Andrew McMullan, Board of Director, H2O.ai, Chief Data & Analytics officer at Commonwealth Bank Of Australia
Bob McMullan, Australian politician
Chelsea McMullan, Canadian documentary filmmaker
David McMullan (b. 1901), Irish footballer (Liverpool FC)
Hayes McMullan (1902–1986), American Delta blues singer, guitarist and songwriter
Jackie McMullan, Provisional Irish Republican Army member
Jim McMullan, actor
Jimmy McMullan, Scottish soccer player
Lyle McMullan, editor and newspaper founder
Kevin McMullan, acoustic guitarist
Patrick McMullan, photographer
Paul McMullan (footballer, born 1984), Scottish footballer (Heart of Midlothian FC)
Paul McMullan (footballer, born 1996), Scottish footballer (Celtic FC)
Paul McMullan (journalist) (born 1963), British journalist

See also
McMullan Bros. Limited, Irish oil company